Marvin Dwight Harvey (born October 17, 1959) is a former American football tight end in the National Football League (NFL). Harvey was drafted in the third round by the Kansas City Chiefs out of the University of Southern Mississippi in the 1981 NFL Draft. He retired after a neck injury, but later returned to the NFL and played for Tampa Bay for a short period before joining the USFL from 1983 to 1985. He married Benita "Bonnie" Marshall in 1981. The following year she founded the NFL Player's Wives Association with the support of Al Davis and Ed. DeBartolo, Jr. The association was run out the NFLPA office in San Francisco, which was headed by Eugene Upshaw. Harvey and Marshall divorced in 1985 and remain friends. 

Marvin is currently a Florida State Trooper living in Tallahassee, Florida. He dedicates his free time to helping teens and young boys to excel in life.

External links
NFL.com player page
Stats

1959 births
Living people
People from Seminole County, Georgia
American football tight ends
Southern Miss Golden Eagles football players
Kansas City Chiefs players